Moto was founded in 1959 in Zimbabwe's Midlands town of Gweru as a weekly community newspaper by the Catholic church. From these modest beginnings, Moto fast became one of the most outspoken voices in the liberation war, providing scathing criticism of the colonial government and support for African nationalist parties. Banned by the Smith regime in 1974, it re-emerged in 1980, first as a newspaper and then as one of the first magazines to provide content in ChiShona, SiNdebele and English.

Moto faced a new set of challenges in the post-liberation era. Firstly, it needed to make the transition from the campaigning stance it adopted in the days of Zimbabwe's Unilateral Declaration of Independence, to a critical, independent voice in the era of majority rule. Under a mandate of being "the voice of the voiceless and defender of the downtrodden", it switched its focus to issues generally marginalised by the state-controlled press, running socio-economic and human-interest stories, often set in rural communities. The magazine also had to negotiate the sometimes awkward relationship between its church base and its outspoken political stance. In this regard it regularly ran features on the formation of the African clergy, paying particular attention to the elevation of Africans to the hierarchy and the ranks of the canonized. Despite ongoing economic difficulties and opposition from the Mugabe government, who made several attempts to shut down the publication, Moto's readership continues to grow, amongst intellectuals, professionals and students, as well as rural readers.

Notes
This text is taken from https://web.archive.org/web/20080810200524/http://www.chimurengalibrary.co.za/periodicals.php?id=5 

1959 establishments in Southern Rhodesia
1974 disestablishments in Rhodesia
1980 establishments in Zimbabwe
Magazines established in 1959
Magazines disestablished in 1974
Magazines established in 1980
Mass media in Gweru
Political magazines
Politics of Zimbabwe
Catholic magazines
Magazines published in Zimbabwe
Irregularly published magazines